The Leonidas-2 represented an effort made by the Greek vehicle manufacturer ELVO to produce an advanced armoured personnel carrier (APC) of its own. It is named after Leonidas, king of the ancient city-state of Sparta. The first version of the Leonidas was the Austrian Saurer 4K 4FA armoured personnel carrier built with minor modifications by the Greek company (then known as Steyr Hellas S.A.) from 1981 until 1987. Initial production was essentially assembly, however Greek content progressively increased. The APC had a 320 hp engine and a weight of 14.8 tons.

Design and development
The 'Leonidas-2' development involved extensive modification of the previous model. This  was done by ELVO in 1987 with the aim to essentially develop it as an armoured infantry fighting vehicle (AIFV). The new version had a weight of 18.8 tons and it used a 450 hp engine; maximum speed was 70 km/h. The construction of the turret became a matter of debates involving interested companies (three versions with different types of turrets were proposed, while there were "demands" that the turret should constructed by EBO), but the vehicle was finally produced without a turret. About 700 were produced, including a number exported to Cyprus. Plans to develop the vehicle further  as 'Leonidas-3' for different roles were abandoned in 2002, as the vehicle was considered outdated. ELVO continued efforts for a modern AIFV development, starting cooperation in 1988 with Steyr-Daimler-Puch of Austria on a joint development, but soon pulled out due to the high cost of the vehicle compared to the Greek Army specifications (Santa Bárbara Sistemas of Spain continued development with the Austrian company, resulting in the ASCOD Ulan/Pizarro AIFV). Eventually ELVO worked on its own, developing a completely new armoured infantry fighting vehicle, the Kentaurus in 1998.

Leonidas production
The table below shows the production run based on the history of publicly known orders, as published in the press. The total appears as 700 vehicles, yet the company ELVO in its internet site mentions a total production of "about 800 vehicles"

Operators

Current operators
 -197
 -493
 -10

See also 
 ELVO Kentaurus
 Saurer 4K 4FA

Notes

External links
ELVO - Leonidas

Armoured fighting vehicles of Greece
Tracked armoured personnel carriers
Hellenic Army
Leonidas I